Dress to Impress is the thirteenth studio album by American singer Keith Sweat. It was released on July 22, 2016 by KDS Entertainment.

Critical reception

Andy Kellman from Allmusic found that Dress to Impress features Sweat's "best round of songs in well over a decade," focusing on "romance and emotional connection. The album sounds fresh while drawing from numerous eras, just as the Sweat Hotel playlist roams from decade to decade [...] With its stream-fishing quantity of songs notwithstanding — 16 cuts, well over an hour in duration — Dress to Impress fulfills its intent."

Track listing 

Notes
 denotes co-producer

Charts

References

2016 albums
Keith Sweat albums